Autochton potrillo, the potrillo skipper, is a species of dicot skipper in the butterfly family Hesperiidae. It is found in the Caribbean Sea, Central America, North America, and South America.

Subspecies
The following subspecies are recognised:
 Autochton potrillo potrillo (Lucas, 1857)
 Autochton potrillo reducta Mabille & Boullet, 1919

References

Further reading

 

Eudaminae
Articles created by Qbugbot
Butterflies described in 1857